The 1902 Spring Hill Badgers football team was an American football team that represented Spring Hill College as an independent during the 1902 college football season. In their second year, the team compiled a 1–0 record.

Schedule

References

Spring Hill
Spring Hill Badgers football seasons
College football undefeated seasons
Spring Hill Badgers football